Planet Rock  may refer to:

 "Planet Rock" (song), a 1982 song by Afrika Bambaataa and the Soulsonic Force
 Planet Rock: The Album, a 1986 album containing the song
 Planet Rock (radio station), DAB radio station in the United Kingdom broadcasting classic rock music